Serpent Mage is a fantasy novel published in 1986 by  Greg Bear. , it is the sequel to The Infinity Concerto.

Plot
Michael Perrin is now back home on Earth, living with his parents and continuing his training. Perrin has inherited Arno Waltiri's home and estate. Perrin moves in and begins to go through Waltiri's papers, where he finds a strange news story about bodies that were discovered in a nearby hotel. Perrin is contacted by a musical faculty member from UCLA, Kristine Pendeers. Pendeers is searching for Infinity Concerto - Opus 45 with hopes that it has been left in Waltiri's estate, with the goal of completing Mahler's unfinished Symphony and performing the two pieces together. Perrin trains an apprentice Sidhe, and tries to arbitrate a peace between Sidhe and humans.

Reviews
Review by Faren Miller (1986) in Locus, #308 September 1986
Review by Pascal J. Thomas (1986) in Fantasy Review, December 1986
Review [French] by Pascal J. Thomas (1987) in A&A, #102
Review by Thomas A. Easton [as by Tom Easton] (1987) in Analog Science Fiction/Science Fact, July 1987
Review by Charles de Lint (1988) in Short Form, February 1988
Review by Tom A. Jones [as by Tom Jones] (1988) in Vector 144
Review by Phyllis McDonald (1988) in Interzone, #24 Summer 1988
Review by Alan Fraser (1989) in Paperback Inferno, #78
Review [French] by Piet Hollander (1991) in Yellow Submarine, #86

References

External links
 Greg Bear.com

1986 American novels
1985 fantasy novels
Novels by Greg Bear
American fantasy novels